This article is a list of diseases of alfalfa (Medicago sativa).

Bacterial diseases

Fungal diseases

Nematodes, parasitic

Viral diseases

Phytoplasmal and spiroplasmal diseases

See also
 Alfalfa pests, pests named for alfalfa

References

Common Names of Diseases, The American Phytopathological Society

Alfalfa